The  2011 Iowa Corn Indy 250 was the fifth running of the Iowa Corn Indy 250 and the eighth round of the 2011 IndyCar Series season. It took place on Saturday, June 25, 2011. The race was contested over 250 laps at the  Iowa Speedway in Newton, Iowa, and was televised by Versus in the United States.

The winner of the 2011 race was Marco Andretti.  Takuma Sato held the pole position running a time of 35.6857 seconds, while Alex Tagliani had the fastest lap running lap 21 in 18.0958 seconds.  The last year winner Tony Kanaan finished in second, while Scott Dixon came in third place.

External links
Results at IndyCar.com

 
Iowa
Iowa Corn Indy 250
Iowa Corn Indy 250